The 9th Vermont Infantry Regiment was a three years' infantry regiment in the Union Army during the American Civil War. It served in the Eastern Theater, from July 1862 to December 1865. It served in the VII, XVII and XXIV Corps.

History
The 9th Vermont Infantry was captured at the Battle of Harpers Ferry during the 1862 Maryland Campaign, but later fought well with the VII, XVIII and XXIV Corps in eastern Virginia and North Carolina, and was one of the first units to enter Richmond, Virginia, in April 1865.

The regiment was mustered into Federal service on July 9, 1862, at Brattleboro, Vermont.

It was engaged in, or present at, Harper's Ferry, Newport Barracks, Chaffin's Farm, Fair Oaks and the Fall of Richmond.

The regiment lost during its term of service: 23 men killed and mortally wounded, 5 died from accident, 2 committed suicide, 36 died in Confederate prisons and 232 died from disease; for a total loss of 298 men.

The regiment mustered out of service on December 1, 1865.

Commanders
 George J. Stannard
 Dudley Kimball Andross
 Edward H. Ripley
 Valentine G. Barney (Acting)

Notable members
 Erastus W. Jewett, Medal of Honor.
 Abel E. Leavenworth, Capt. Co. K; Assistant Adjutant General, District of Appomattox.
 Josiah O. Livingston, Medal of Honor.
 Theodore S. Peck, Medal of Honor recipient, Adjutant General of the Vermont National Guard.

References

External links
 Vermont National Guard Library and Museum

Units and formations of the Union Army from Vermont
1862 establishments in Vermont